Rudolf Simek (born 21 February 1954) is an Austrian philologist and religious studies scholar who is Professor and Chair of Ancient German and Nordic Studies at the University of Bonn. Simek specializes in Germanic studies, and is the author of several notable works on Germanic religion and mythology (including Old Norse religion and mythology), Germanic peoples, Vikings, Old Norse literature, and the culture of Medieval Europe.

Biography
Since 1995, Simek has been Professor and Chair of Ancient German and Nordic Studies at the University of Bonn. Simek was appointed Professor of Comparative Religion at the University of Tromsø in 1999, and Professor of Old Nordic Studies at the University of Sydney in 2000. Simek  has held a number of visiting professorships, having had long research stays at the universities of Reykjavik, Copenhagen, London, Oxford and Sydney. From 2000 to 2003, Simek was Chairman of the International Saga Society (German: Internationalen-Saga-Gesellschaft). Simek is a member of many additional learned societies, including the International Arthurian Society, the Österreichische Gesellschaft für Germanistik, the Viking Society for Northern Research, the Society for Northern Studies, and the Royal Gustavus Adolphus Academy.

Research
Simek researches a wide variety of topics connected to the Middle Ages. This includes Germanic religion and mythology (including Old Norse religion and mythology), Vikings and the Viking Age, Old Norse literature, and medieval science (including astronomy) and popular religion. Simek has published a number of notable works on these subjects, several of which have been translated into multiple languages.

Selected works

 Lexikon der germanischen Mythologie, Stuttgart, Kröner, 1984  (translations to English, French and Icelandic)
 Lexikon der altnordischen Literatur (with Hermann Pálsson), Stuttgart, Kröner, 1987 
 Altnordische Kosmographie. Studien und Quellen zu Weltbild und Weltbeschreibung in Norwegen und Island vom 12. bis zum 14. Jahrhundert, Berlin/New York, de Gruyter, 1990 (Reallexikon der germanischen Altertumskunde. Ergänzungsbände, Bd. 4) 
 Erde und Kosmos im Mittelalter. München, C.H. Beck, 1992. 
 Die Wikinger,  München, C.H. Beck, 1998  (translation to Spanish)
 Religion und Mythologie der Germanen, Stuttgart, Theiss 2003 
 Götter und Kulte der Germanen, München, C.H. Beck, 2004 
 Runes, Magic and Religion: A Sourcebook (with John McKinnell und Klaus Düwel), Wien, Fassbaender, 2004  
 Mittelerde – Tolkien und die germanische Mythologie, München, C.H. Beck, 2005 
 Der Glaube der Germanen, Limburg und Kevelaer, Lahn-Verlag, 2005 
 Die Germanen, Stuttgart, Reclam, 2006. 
 Die Edda. C. H. Beck, München 2007,  (C. H. Beck Wissen).
 Ewige Orte. Reliquien und heiligen Stätten in Wien. Metro, Wien 2007, .
 Artus-Lexikon. Mythos und Geschichte, Werke und Personen der europäischen Artusdichtung. Reclam, Stuttgart 2012, .
 Die Schiffe der Wikinger. Reclam, Stuttgart 2014, .
 Monster im Mittelalter. Die phantastische Welt der Wundervölker und Fabelwesen. Böhlau, Köln, Weimar, Wien 2015. .
 Vinland! Wie die Wikinger Amerika entdeckten. C. H. Beck, München 2016, .
 Trolle. Ihre Geschichte von der Mythologie bis zum Internet. Böhlau, Köln/Weimar/Wien 2018, .
 Die Geschichte der Normannen. Von Wikingerhäuptlingen zu Königen Siziliens. Reclam, Ditzingen 2018, .
 Monster im Mittelalter. Köln und Wien: Böhlau 2019,

See also

References

External links
 Page of Rudolf Simek at the Scandinavian studies chair of University of Bonn
 Page of Rudolf Simek at the Institute for German studies of University of Bonn
 List of publications

1954 births
20th-century Austrian historians
21st-century Austrian historians
Academics of the University of Edinburgh
Austrian librarians
Austrian medievalists
Austrian non-fiction writers
Austrian philologists
Germanic studies scholars
Germanists
Living people
Members of the Royal Gustavus Adolphus Academy
Old Norse studies scholars
People from Eisenstadt
Academic staff of the University of Bonn
Academic staff of the University of Tromsø
University of Vienna alumni
Academic staff of the University of Vienna
Writers on Germanic paganism